K'Von Wallace (born July 25, 1997) is an American football free safety for the Philadelphia Eagles of the National Football League (NFL). He played college football at Clemson and was drafted by the Eagles in the fourth round of the 2020 NFL Draft.

Early years
Wallace attended Highland Springs High School in Highland Springs, Virginia. He played defensive back and wide receiver in high school. He committed to Clemson University to play college football.

College career
Wallace played at Clemson from 2016 to 2019. During his career he played in 59 games with 36 starts. He was a member of the Tigers 2016 and 2018 national championship teams. He finished his career with 156 tackles, five interceptions, two sacks and a touchdown.

Professional career

Wallace was drafted by the Philadelphia Eagles in the fourth round with the 127th overall pick of the 2020 NFL Draft. In a week 2 matchup against the Los Angeles Rams, Wallace recovered a fumble by wide receiver Cooper Kupp on a punt return in the 37–19 loss.

On September 28, 2021, Wallace was placed on injured reserve after suffering a partially separated shoulder in Week 3. He was activated on October 30.

On January 29, 2023, Wallace was slammed to the ground by San Francisco 49ers offensive tackle Trent Williams after a scuffle between the two teams during the NFC Championship. Both players were ejected from the game.

References

External links
Clemson Tigers bio

1997 births
Living people
People from Highland Springs, Virginia
Players of American football from Virginia
American football safeties
Clemson Tigers football players
Philadelphia Eagles players